Hautai Marine Reserve is a marine reserve offshore from the Westland District and West Coast Region of New Zealand's South Island.

It is the country's most remote mainland main reserve, located south of Haast, a two day walk from the nearest road, in an area with no walking tracks.

The reserve was established to protect marine habitats and animals of the southern West Coast. Marine mammals like New Zealand fur seals, Fiordland crested penguins and blue penguins are abundant.

See also
 Marine reserves of New Zealand

References

Marine reserves of New Zealand
Protected areas of the West Coast, New Zealand
Westland District